Sebebim (My Reason) is the debut studio album by Turkish singer Demet Akalın. It was released in 1996 by Elenor Müzik. The lyrics and musics were provided by a number of different individuals, including Seda Akay, Niran Ünsal, Hakkı Yalçın, Murat Yerinli, Naşide Göktürk, Tolga Turan, Engin Kuduğ, Özlem Ekşioğlu, Metin Özülkü, and Ayhan Çakar. Tarık Sezer, Metin Özülkü, and Selim Çaldıran served as the album's arrangers. The songs "Sebebim", "Asla Affedilmez" and "Sakın Vazgeçme" were pieces from this album that were turned into music videos.

Naim Dilmener wrote in his review for Hürriyet that Akalın was still inexperienced and her shaky vocals made the album poorly received.

Track listing

Personnel 
 Supervisor: Demet Akalın
 Producer: Atilla Alpsakarya
 Production: Elenor Müzik
 Producer: Muhteşem Candan
 Photographs: Erol Atar
 Make-up: Neriman Kardeş
 Hair: Diba / Mahmut Ebil
 Print: FRS Matbaacılık
 Design: FRS Graphic Services Lütfü Çolak

Credits adapted from Discogs.

Release history

References

Demet Akalın albums
1996 debut albums